This is a list of the songs that reached number one in Mexico in 2009, according to Monitor Latino.

Monitor Latino's chart rankings are based on airplay across radio states in Mexico utilizing the Radio Tracking Data, LLC in real time. Charts are ranked from Monday to Sunday. Besides the General chart, Monitor Latino published "Pop", "Regional Mexican" and "Anglo" charts.

Chart history

General
In 2009, eight songs reached number one on the General chart, the lowest amount for a full year since the chart was founded in 2007; all of these songs were entirely in Spanish. Five acts achieved their first General number-one song in Mexico: La 5ª Estación, Paulina Rubio, Shakira, La Arrolladora Banda El Limón and David Bisbal.

"Loba" by Shakira was the longest-running General number-one of the year, staying at the top position for fourteen consecutive weeks, and "Te presumo" by Banda El Recodo was best-performing song of the year.

Pop

Regional

English

See also
List of Top 20 songs for 2009 in Mexico
List of number-one albums of 2009 (Mexico)

References

2009
Number-one songs
Mexico